Maximilian Dörnbach (born 24 December 1995) is a German track cyclist.

Major results

2011
 1st  Individual sprint, Junior National Track Championships
2012
 1st  Team sprint, Junior European Track Championships
 Junior National Track Championships
1st  Kilometer
1st  Team sprint (with Richard Assmus and Nikolai Hoffmeister)
1st  Keirin
1st  Individual sprint
2013
 Junior World Track Championships
1st  Kilometer
3rd Team sprint
 Junior European Track Championships
1st  Team sprint
1st  Individual sprint
2nd Kilometer
2015
 Under-23 European Track Championships
1st  Team sprint
1st  Kilometer
 National Track Championships
1st  Kilometer
2nd Team sprint
2nd Keirin
2016
 Under-23 European Track Championships
1st  Kilometer
3rd Team sprint
2017
 National Track Championships
1st  Kilometer
1st  Team sprint (with Erik Balzer and Maximilian Levy)
3rd Keirin
 World Cup
1st Team sprint, Cali (with Robert Förstemann, Max Niederlag and Eric Engler)
2nd Kilometer, Cali

References

1995 births
Living people
German male cyclists
German track cyclists
People from Heilbad Heiligenstadt
Cyclists from Thuringia
21st-century German people